Eardley Peiris was a radio announcer with Radio Ceylon who joined the radio station in the late 1950s and enjoyed huge popularity with millions of listeners across South Asia. He presented some of the key radio programs like Holiday Choice, he also read the English news bulletins of Radio Ceylon.

Peiris and the select band of announcers of Radio Ceylon enjoyed iconic status in South Asia. Radio Ceylon ruled the airwaves in the 1950s and 1960s.

See also
Radio Ceylon
Sri Lanka Broadcasting Corporation
List of Sri Lankan broadcasters

References

Bibliography 
 Wavell, Stuart. - The Art of Radio - Training Manual written by the Director Training of the CBC. - Ceylon Broadcasting Corporation, 1969.

External links 
 Sri Lanka Broadcasting Corporation Website
 SLBC-creating new waves of history
Eighty Years of Broadcasting in Sri Lanka

Sri Lankan radio journalists
Year of birth missing